Ludovic Gotin (born 25 July 1985) is a Guadeloupean footballer who currently plays for French club Le Moule on the island of Guadeloupe in the Guadeloupe Division d'Honneur. He plays as a striker. Though Gotin has spent the majority of his career playing on the island, he did have a stint in metropolitan France in 2005–06 playing with amateur club CS Avion.

International career

International goals
Scores and results list Guadeloupe's goal tally first.

Achievements
Guadeloupe Championnat National: 1
 2009

Coupe de Guadeloupe: 1
 2008

References

External links
 

1985 births
Living people
Association football forwards
French footballers
Guadeloupean footballers
Guadeloupe international footballers
French people of Guadeloupean descent
2007 CONCACAF Gold Cup players
2009 CONCACAF Gold Cup players
2011 CONCACAF Gold Cup players
CS Avion players
CS Moulien players